Valeh (also Romanized as Vāleh) is a village in Valupey Rural District, in the Central District of Savadkuh County, Mazandaran Province, Iran. At the 2006 census, its population was 63, in 21 families.
It has a dry climate, hot days and cold nights

References 

Populated places in Savadkuh County